Greystead is a village and civil parish in Northumberland, England  west of Bellingham. The population as of the 2011 census was less than 100. It shares a parish council with the adjacent civil parish of Tarset.

Governance 
Greystead is in the parliamentary constituency of Hexham.

External links 
GENUKI (Accessed: 3 December 2008)

Villages in Northumberland